Paula Alma Kelly (October 21, 1942 – February 8, 2020) was an American actress, singer, dancer and choreographer in films, television and theatre. Kelly's career began during the mid–1960s in theatre, making her Broadway debut as Mrs. Veloz in the 1964 musical Something More!, alongside Barbara Cook. Kelly's other Broadway credits include The Dozens (1969), Paul Sills' Story Theatre (1971), Ovid's Metamorphoses (1971), and Sophisticated Ladies (1981), based on the music of Duke Ellington, appearing with Gregory Hines and Phyllis Hyman.

Early life and education
Born in Jacksonville, Florida, Kelly was one of three daughters born to Ruth and Lehman Kelly, a jazz musician. By age six, Kelly's family had relocated to Harlem neighborhood of New York City. For high school, Kelly attended the Fiorello H. LaGuardia High School of Music & Art, majoring in music. Kelly continued her studies at the Juilliard School of Music, where she majored in dance under Martha Hill. Graduating in 1964 with an M.S. degree, Kelly performed as a soloist with major modern dance companies such as Martha Graham, Donald McKayle, and Alvin Ailey.

Career
 Kelly performed as guest artist and sometimes assistant choreographer for numerous television musical specials, including Sammy and Friends (starring Sammy Davis, Jr.); co-choreographer of the BBC production of Peter Pan, in which she also performed the role of Tiger-Lily; Quincy Jones' TV tribute to Duke Ellington, We Love You Madly; The Richard Pryor Show; and Gene Kelly's New York, New York, in which the two Kellys performed a duet.

Kelly performed a dance solo at the 41st Academy Awards for the nominated title song from Chitty Chitty Bang Bang (1968). She appeared on the London stage in Sweet Charity with dancer and actress Juliet Prowse, for which Kelly won the London Variety Award for Best Supporting Actress. She starred in the record-breaking west coast premiere of Don't Bother Me, I Can't Cope at the Mark Taper Forum, for which she was awarded the Los Angeles Drama Critics Circle Award, Variety, and the first of three NAACP Image Awards.

Kelly's film credits include the Bob Fosse-directed film Sweet Charity; Soylent Green; The Spook Who Sat by the Door; The Andromeda Strain; Uptown Saturday Night; Lost in the Stars, Jo Jo Dancer, Your Life Is Calling; Drop Squad; and Once Upon a Time...When We Were Colored.

Kelly had a regular role as Liz Williams on the first season of the sitcom Night Court, for which she received an Emmy Award nomination. Kelly also guest-starred in a variety of television movies and sitcoms, including Sanford and Son, Kojak, Police Woman, Golden Girls, Good Times, Any Day Now and in the Oprah Winfrey-produced TV mini-series The Women of Brewster Place (based on the 1982 novel of the same name by Gloria Naylor), in which she portrayed one half of a lesbian couple (with Lonette McKee) struggling against homophobia in an inner-city ghetto. Kelly was nominated for a second Emmy for her role in The Women of Brewster Place.

Personal life and death
On September 15, 1985, Kelly married British film director Don Chaffey. They had one child together, a daughter. Chaffey died in November 1990.

Kelly died of heart failure on February 8, 2020, at age 77. Upon her death, she was cremated and her ashes returned to her daughter.

Filmography

Film

Television

References

External links
 
 
 
 

1942 births
2020 deaths
Actresses from Jacksonville, Florida
Actresses from New York City
American female dancers
American dancers
20th-century American actresses
American television actresses
African-American actresses
American film actresses
American stage actresses
Fiorello H. LaGuardia High School alumni
Juilliard School alumni
Dancers from New York (state)
20th-century African-American women
20th-century African-American people
21st-century African-American people
21st-century African-American women